Como Deus Castiga is a 1920 Brazilian silent drama film directed and screen written by Antônio Leite and Miguel Milano. It is based on a novel by Joaquim Manoel de Macedo.

The film premiered on 12 July 1920 in Rio de Janeiro.

Cast
Ignácio Brito   
Clarinda Lopes

References

External links
 

1920 drama films
1920 films
Brazilian black-and-white films
Brazilian silent films
Brazilian drama films
Silent drama films